Hugh Sutherland Valentine (1848 – 10 September 1932) was a 19th-century independent conservative Member of Parliament in Otago, New Zealand.

He represented the Waikaia electorate from 1887 to 1890, and then the Tuapeka electorate from 1890 to 1893, when he retired. He later unsuccessfully contested the Wallace electorate for the Conservatives in the 1896 New Zealand general election coming third of five candidates behind two Liberals, the winner Michael Gilfedder and the Rev. Thomas Neave. Valentine did finish ahead of fellow Conservative Henry Hirst and Liberal James Mackintosh. After that, he retired from politics.

Valentine died in Dunedin on 10 September 1932, and he was buried in Gore Cemetery.

References

1848 births
1932 deaths
19th-century New Zealand politicians
Independent MPs of New Zealand
Members of the New Zealand House of Representatives
New Zealand MPs for South Island electorates